Don't Just Sit There! is a television show on Nickelodeon that first aired in 1988 and lasted for three seasons. It was a variety talk show comedy show. Segments included making food or taking things apart such as a Nintendo, interviews with celebrity guests, or straight comedy sketches. The basic concept of the show was to give kids ideas for different things they could do rather than just sitting and watching TV, hence the title. Out of Order was the house band on the series; they would later get to sing on the show as well as participate in sketches.

The show's guests included Davy Jones, Mayim Bialik, Lou Diamond Phillips, Tami Erin, Downtown Julie Brown, Michael Palin, William Shatner, "Weird Al" Yankovic, Michael Richards, New Kids on the Block and Robert Englund wearing his Freddy Krueger make-up and costume. One of the first musical guests on the show was the ska band Fishbone.

Don't Just Sit there would not be a show without the establishment and guidance the show Double Dare had given. Will Friedle went on to play the role of Eric Matthews in the show "Boy Meets World" for the 7 seasons it was aired. He was quoted talking about how crazy it is that the shows are still very popular today.

Cast 
 Will Friedle as Host
 Matt Brown as Host
 Wendy Douglas as Host
 B. J. Schaffer as Host
 Alie Smith as Host
 Mike Baldwin as Band Member (drummer)
 Chris Guice as Band Member (bass guitarist)
 Ed Jahn as Band Member (keyboards)
 Buxton Pryor as Band Member (guitarist)

External links

References 

1980s American children's comedy television series
1990s American children's comedy television series
1980s American television talk shows
1990s American television talk shows
1980s Nickelodeon original programming
1990s Nickelodeon original programming
1988 American television series debuts
1990 American television series endings